Rhopalomma is an extinct genus of Ommatine beetle. It is known from a single species, Rhopalomma stefaniae described from the Upper Jurassic (Tithonian) Talbragar fossil locality in New South Wales, Australia.

References

Ommatidae
Prehistoric beetle genera